Actors of the Comédie-Française, also traditionally known as The Coquettes (from ), is an oil on panel painting in the Hermitage Museum, Saint Petersburg, by the French Rococo artist Antoine Watteau (1684–1721). Variously dated within the 1710s by scholars, the painting forms a compact half-length composition that combines portraiture and genre painting, notably influenced by Venetian school, the Le Nain brothers, and Watteau's master Claude Gillot; one of the rarest cases in Watteau's body of work, it shows five figures — two women, two men, and a black boy — amid a darkened background, in contrary to landscapes that are usually found in Watteau's fêtes galantes.

For three centuries, there were numerous attempts to identify the subject and the characters represented by Watteau; various authors thought the painting to be either a theatrical scene featuring commedia dell'arte masks, or a group portrait of Watteau's contemporaries. Beginning from the late 20th century, Russian and Western sources accept a theory developed within the Hermitage Museum that holds the painting to be a group portrait of the Comédie-Française players who performed in the playwright Florent Carton Dancourt's play The Three Cousins. Given a variety of available interpretations, the painting has been known under a number of various titles; its traditional naming is derived from anonymous verses, with which the painting was published as an etching in the 1730s.

Since then the painting was among Russian imperial collections in the Hermitage and, later, in the Gatchina Palace, before entering the Hermitage again in the 1920s; as part of the museum's permanent exhibition, it remains on display in the Winter Palace.

Description

Actors of the Comédie-Française is an oil painting on a pearwood panel that measures approximately 20 by 25 cm. The painting is a compact half-length composition that shows five figures standing around a high wooden balustrade; most of the figures can be related to extant drawings, either directly or through comparable studies in Watteau's body of work. It has been noted by scholars that the half-length representation of Watteau's painting was influenced by Venetian painting; influences from French school such as the Le Nain brothers and Watteau's master Claude Gillot are also cited.

The rightmost figure is an outwardly old man dressed in a skullcap; he stands upon a cane in the left hand, while holding a mushroom hat in the right hand. The figure is generally associated with an early full-length sanguine study ( 64;  75), published as an etching engraved by Jean Audran ( 157); the earlier version of the subject was introduced by Watteau in Marriage Contract and Country Dancing (now in the Prado, Madrid) and L'Accordee du Village (now in Sir John Soane's Museum, London). It has been noted, however, that the study is probably a reduced version of a larger, more vibrant study drawn from life, similar to other studies such as the ones located in the British Museum, London (PM 84; RP 130), and in the Teylers Museum, Haarlem (PM 53; RP 135), respectively. Given the rendering of the hand holding the cane and the quality of the man's face, it has been suggested that Watteau relied on additional drawings for the painting.

By the balustrade's other side, a young girl is shown in a lightly colored, striped dress with ruff, standing behind a black boy servant in green-striped clothes; over the girl's shoulder, a head of a young man, dressed as Mezzetino, appears in a large motley beret. The girl and the boy's figures are usually related to a Louvre sheet of eight head studies, with the boy's head directly adopted into the Hermitage painting; the girl's figure is also thought to be related to the Louvre drawing, exactly a girl's head notably used in a version of The Embarkation for Cythera located in the Charlottenburg Palace. Young people of color were a recurrent theme in Watteau's paintings and drawings, possibly influenced by works of Paolo Veronese; these are also present in Les Charmes de la vie (Wallace Collection, London), La Conversation (Toledo Museum of Art), and Les Plaisirs du Bal (Dulwich Gallery, London). The head of the young man has no directly related drawings, but is notably present, with slight differences, in The Italian Comedians now in the Getty Museum, Los Angeles; the figure has also been associated by Nemilova with a head on a sheet of studies located in a private collection in New York City (PM 746; RP 456) and, to a lesser success, with a figure from a sheet now in the National Gallery of Art, Washington, D.C. (PM 665; RP 475), while  thought the head to be related with Il Capitano's figure present in the Louvre-owned Pierrot.

Opposite to the old man, the leftmost figure is a young woman turned to the right in profile, wearing Polish-styled red dress and white chipper, leaning on the balustrade and holding a black mask in the right hand; from the X-ray analysis, it has been found that she was to be bareheaded, wearing a different attire, and had to have her mask placed on the balustrade rather than holding it. Similarly to the old man's figure, the woman's figure has been related to an early, small, full-length study (RP 44) of a similarly dressed yet differently posed woman, that has been adopted into a more detailed drawing, later used in The Polish Woman, traditionally but not definitively attributed to Watteau (now in the National Museum, Warsaw). Various studies of women's hands holding masks have been related to the painting, with a study in the Kupferstichkabinett, Berlin (PM 828; RP 417), regarded as the closest. There is also a now untraced sanguine and black chalk study of the woman and the boy (PM 541; RP R591) that closely corresponds, albeit in reverse, with the painting; Parker and Mathey, who attributed the drawing to Watteau, considered it to be a preliminary study, and so did Nemilova and, during the 1984–1985 exhibition, Rosenberg; however, Eidelberg rejected that relation, as well as the sheet's authenticity, pointing out that the drawing is more corresponding to the etching rather than to the painting; in the 1996 catalogue raisonné, Rosenberg and Louis-Antoine Prat also list the sheet as rejected.

The painting is generally in good condition, despite losses and restorations underwent in the past. Damages found via visual observations include a restored crack along the old man's cloak, to the right; there are cracks in shaded areas, more importantly along the lower edge and around the girl's head; a loss has been painted in above the girl's left shoulder. X-ray analysis of the painting, performed by Soviet scholars in the 1970s, has also revealed alterations made to the leftmost figure during the painting's production: the woman was to be bare-headed rather than wearing the bonnet, and was to wear a free-flowing costume with horizontal stripes, different from a Polish-styled one found in the final painting; her hand didn't hold the mask, but lay on the banister.

Identity of the subject
Until the middle of the 20th century, sources and studies on Watteau variously defined the work's subject. In notes to Pellegrino Antonio Orlandi's Abecedario pittorico, Pierre-Jean Mariette referred to the work as Coquettes qui pour voir galans au rendez vous, after the first verses of quatrains accompanying Thomassin's engraving for the Recueil Jullienne; Mariette thought the panel depicts "people in disguise for a ball, among whom is one dressed as an old man."

Later sources, more prominently in France and Russia, similarly had various definitions on the subject:  refers to the work as  en masques in the manuscript catalogue of the Hermitage collection; the Hermitage's 1797 catalogue features the title The Mascarade, whereas the 1859 inventory registry features only the work's description—"two women, talking with two men, and a negro beside them". In his writings,  referred to the work as Le Rendez-vous du bal masqué, before Edmond de Goncourt's Catalogue raisonné... introduced the Mariette-mentioned title into common use.

In an 1896 article published in Gazette des Beaux-Arts, the French author Gaston Schéfer was the first to consider The Coquettes to be based on portrait drawings rather than being a theatrical scene. Schéfer suggested from an inscription under Boucher's etching after the Berlin drawing, found in a copy of Figures des differents caracteres held by the Bibliothèque de l'Arsenal, that the old man on the right of the painting was modelled after Pierre-Maurice Haranger, a canon of the Saint-Germain l'Auxerrois who was a close friend of Watteau; the lady in red was thought by Schéfer to be the Comédie-Française actress Charlotte Desmares, based on comparison of the composition with Lepicié's etching of her portrait by Charles-Antoine Coypel. Later in the early 1900s, playwright Virgile Josz presumed the painting to be a depiction of commedia dell'arte masks, with the old man as Pantalone, the women as Rosaura and Isabella, and the young man as Scapino; in later years, these points were adopted by a number of scholars Josz's contemporary Louis de Fourcaud considered figures to be a family group dressed for an elegant masquerade."

In a 1950 monograph on Watteau, Hélène Adhémar identified the lady in red as Charlotte Desmares, similarly to Schéfer; Adhémar's point was furthered in Karl Parker and Jacques Mathey's 1957–1958 catalogue of Watteau drawings; they concluded that the old man could be another Comédie-Française player, Pierre Le Noir. In the Soviet Union, the Hermitage staff member Inna Nemilova supported these points, and also concluded the young man to be Philippe Poisson. In addition, Nemilova pointed out Desmares could be possibly depicted by Watteau in both versions of The Embarkation for Cythera, and also other canvas and various drawings.

Provenance
In an article on the Hermitage's 1922–1925 exhibition of French paintings, published in the March 1928 issue of Gazette des Beaux-Arts, the Russian scholar  reported that according to an inscription found on the panel's verso, The Coquettes belonged to the painter  (1659–1736), a curator of the royal collections who authored a 1709–1710 inventory of the paintings in possession of King Louis XIV; in 1984, Rosenberg said that he wasn't surprised about Ernst's report, given Bailly's relations within artistic circles. The label has been deciphered as "N Bailly [prove]nant <...> de lonay aux gallery;" it has been noted that de Lonay was an expert mentioned by the Parisian merchant and art collector Pierre Crozat — once a patron of Watteau — in his last will and testament; in the early 1900s, Virgile Josz speculated that Crozat could once own the painting.

As part of the Crozat collection, The Coquettes was acquired for the Hermitage, then recently established by Empress Catherine the Great in Saint Petersburg. At some point in the mid-19th century, the painting was taken to the Gatchina Palace; it was present in the Oval Chamber, a personal room of Tsar Paul I in the palace's ground floor, where it was photographed in the early 1910s. In 1920, The Coquettes was restored to the Hermitage; as part of the museum's contemporary exhibition, the painting is on display in room 284, formerly the second room of military pictures in the Winter Palace.

Authorship 
Authenticity of the panel has never been seriously questioned until the early 20th century, when the Russian art historian  considered it to be a copy by Philippe Mercier, a prominent English follower of Watteau; in a letter to the German scholar , who compiled an album and catalogue of Watteau's work, Wrangel pointed out that the blond actress lacks the coiffure seen in Thomassin's print, and there were also differences in the actor at the right. On the Russian fellow's advice, Zimmermann had classified the painting among the "doubtful pictures". In the early 1970s, the panel's authenticity was questioned in the four-volume survey edited by Jean Ferré that, based on Wrangel's doubts and inconsistency found in contemporary sources, listed The Coquettes as "attributed to Watteau." Later studies have ruled reservations out, given the work's condition as well as related drawings and Thomassin's print; in the 1960s, Nemilova presumed Wrangel have been led to his conclusion because of the painting's obscurity during its provenance in the Gatchina Palace; much later, Martin Eidelberg adds that Mercier could not paint with the same characteristics and artistic level Watteau had.

Dating 
Dating of the painting remains somewhat imprecise, varying from early to late years of Watteau's career. In 1950, Adhémar listed The Coquettes as a Spring-Autumn 1716 work. In 1957, Charles Sterling suggested a 1716–1717 dating, while in 1959, Jacques Mathey proposed a relatively early date of 1714. Regarding aforementioned datings as too late, Nemilova dated the painting ; the Soviet scholar based her dating on comparing the painting with Du bel âge..., a lost painting by Watteau that is similarly a half-length composition, having compositional rhythm and visual features similar to these found on the Hermitage painting. In her dating, Nemilova also relied upon several other works attributed to the early 1710s by Adhémar and Mathey: La Conversation, The Dreamer, La Polonnoise, and Polish Woman; to Nemilova, who considered Polish-styled costumes to be fashionable in France during the early 1710s, in light of the then recent Battle of Poltava, the sitter's dress was the most important point for her dating.

In later publications, a variety of dating is also given. In a 1968 catalogue raisonné, Ettore Camesasca preferred , a dating also used by Donald Posner and Federico Zeri. In the 1984–1985 exhibition catalogue, Rosenberg also dates it , and so does Mary Vidal.

Related prints
The print was notably mentioned in François-Bernard Lépicié's obituary notice for Thomassin that appeared in the March 1741 issue of Mercure de France, and later by Pierre-Jean Mariette in Notes manuscrites; in subsequent years, it served as a source to a number of pastiches.

Thomassin's etching was anonymously reproduced as a miniature print, captioned L'Amour, sous un déguisment.... A Favourite Sultana (also called Preparation for the Masquerade), an oval stipple print depicting the turbaned woman at the right of Thomassin's engraving, was produced in London in 1785 by Italian-born artist Francesco Bartolozzi, and has the misleading declaration "Watteau pinxt." Another engraving of the composition, called La Comédie italienne, was produced by Félix-Jean Gauchard after Thomassin's print, to accompany the entry on Watteau published in Charles Blanc's series Histoire des peintres des toutes les écoles. École français in 1862-63.

Mascarade (also spelled Masquerade), a mezzotint by French-born English printmaker John Simon, was mentioned by Charles Le Blanc and John Chaloner Smith in their respective studies, and was presumed to be a repetition of Thomassin's print by some authors (notably including Dacier and Vuaflart), given similarity in the number of characters.

Exhibition history

Quotes

Notes

References

Citations

Bibliography

 
 
 
 
 
 
 
 
 
 
 
 
 
 
 
 
 
 
 
 
 
 
 
 
 
 
 
  For the English edition, see .
 
 
 
 
 
 
 
 
 
 
 
 
 
 
 
 
  Published in English as

Further reading

 
 
 
 
 
 
 
 
 
 
 
 
 
 
 
 
 
 
 
 
 
 
 
 
 
 
 
 
 
 
 
 
 
 
 
  Cat. no. 417.

External links
 Actors of the Comédie-Française at the Hermitage's official website
 Actors of the Comédie-Française at the Web Gallery of Art

Oil paintings
Panel painting
1710s paintings
Paintings by Antoine Watteau
Paintings in the collection of the Hermitage Museum
Paintings of children
Comedie-Francaise
18th-century portraits
Group portraits by French artists
Crozat collection
Black people in art